Mike Daum (born October 30, 1995) is an American professional basketball player for Derthona Basket of the Italian Lega Basket Serie A (LBA). He played college basketball for South Dakota State University. A  power forward, Daum was named the Summit League Player of the Year three times.

College career
Daum came to South Dakota State from small town Kimball, Nebraska in 2014. After sitting out his first year as a redshirt to gain strength and improve, he mostly came off the bench for the Jackrabbits in the 2015–16 season.

Despite not starting, Daum averaged 15.2 points and 6.2 rebounds per game and was named the Summit League's Sixth Man of the Year and first-team all-conference. Daum's ability to score both inside and from three-point range earned him the nickname "The Dauminator".

As a redshirt sophomore, Daum became a full-time starter and was named the preseason Summit League Player of the Year. After averaging 25.1 points and 8.1 rebounds per game, Daum made good on this prediction by winning the conference Player of the Year award at the conclusion of the season. During the season, Daum scored a season-high 51 points in a conference win over Fort Wayne.

Prior to the start of the 2017–18 season, Daum was named the preseason Summit League Player of the Year and was named to the preseason watch lists for the Oscar Robertson Trophy, the Karl Malone Award and the Lute Olson Award. On February 1, 2018, Daum eclipsed the 2,000-career-point milestone. Following his junior season, Daum declared for the 2018 NBA draft without signing with an agent. He subsequently decided to exercise this option and return for his senior season.

Coming into his senior year, Daum was named Preseason Summit League Player of the Year. On December 7, 2018, Daum became the Summit League’s all-time leading scorer. In a 42-point outing against Southern, Daum passed former Oral Roberts forward Caleb Green’s conference record 2,504 points. On December 18, 2018, he collected his 1,000th rebound. On February 23, 2019, Daum became the tenth player in NCAA Division I history to score 3,000 points.

Professional career

Obradoiro
Daum was available for the 2019 NBA draft, but was not selected. He was subsequently signed by the Portland Trail Blazers to a summer league contract.

On July 27, 2019, Daum signed his first professional contract with Monbus Obradoiro of the Liga ACB. Daum averaged 9.0 points per game, 0.4 assists per game and 3.7 rebounds per game.  He re-signed with the team on July 21, 2020.

On July 22, 2021, Daum signed with the newly promoted in the Italian Serie A, Derthona Basket.

The Basketball Tournament
Daum joined House of 'Paign, a team composed primarily of Illinois alumni in The Basketball Tournament 2020. He led all scorers with 21 points and 10 rebounds in a 76–53 win over War Tampa in the first round. Daum scored 23 points as the team upset Carmen's Crew 76–68 in the second round.

See also
 List of NCAA Division I men's basketball career scoring leaders
 List of NCAA Division I men's basketball career free throw scoring leaders
 List of NCAA Division I men's basketball players with 2000 points and 1000 rebounds

References

External links
South Dakota State Jackrabbits bio
College stats @ sports-reference.com

1995 births
Living people
All-American college men's basketball players
American expatriate basketball people in Spain
American men's basketball players
Basketball players from Nebraska
Liga ACB players
Obradoiro CAB players
People from Kimball, Nebraska
Power forwards (basketball)
South Dakota State Jackrabbits men's basketball players